Living Legends is a 2014 Bulgarian comedy film written and directed by Niki Iliev.
Director Locations = Ivo Atanasiv

Cast 
 Orlin Pavlov - Pavel
 Niki Iliev - Boyan
 Sanya Borisova - Chrisi
 Dimo Alexiev - Martin
 Lubomir Kovatchev - Doncho
 Georgi Kadurin - Julian
 Yana Marinova - Monika

References

External links 

2014 comedy films
2010s buddy comedy films
2014 films
Bulgarian comedy films
Films set in Bulgaria
Films shot in Bulgaria
Films about amnesia